Sergei Ivanovich Nedosekin (born May 1, 1947) is a Russian professional football coach and a former player.

Career
Born in Uzlovsky District, Tula Oblast, Nedosekin began playing amateur football as a forward for a local club in Skopin after studying at university. In 1966, he joined FC Spartak Ryazan where he played over 400 league matches over 13 seasons in the Soviet leagues.

After he retired from playing, Nedosekin managed FC Spartak Ryazan, leading the club to a second place finish in the 1992 Russian First League.

References

External links
 Profile at footballfacts.ru

1947 births
Living people
Soviet footballers
Russian football managers
Association football midfielders
FC Spartak Ryazan players
Sportspeople from Tula Oblast